Avatha noctuoides is a species of moth of the family Erebidae. It is found in Java, Singapore, Borneo, Myanmar, the Andamans, India and China (Hainan).

Adults are similar to Avatha discolor, but always have an antemedial black area and smaller black flecks on the costa. The postmedial is paler. The hindwings have subtornal fasciation.

The larvae feed on Allophylus, Schleichera and Lepisanthes species. Young larvae rest along the ribs and veins of the undersides of the leaves of the host plant. When they grown larger they switch to stalks and twigs. Pupation takes place is in a loose cell of leaves joined with silk.

References

Moths described in 1852
Avatha
Moths of Asia